Michael "Fancy" O'Neil (1853 – October 10, 1917) was an American professional baseball player whose career in the National Association consisted of one game for the  Hartford Dark Blues.  The game took place on October 23, 1874 when he played all nine innings in right field in a 13–1 loss to the Boston Red Stockings.  Peter Morris, a member of SABR, claims that O'Neil's nickname of "Fancy" is from his time as a boxer, as well as that he was born in Ireland to parents Michael and Sarah.  He grew up in New York City and Hartford, Connecticut.

References

External links

Major League Baseball right fielders
19th-century baseball players
Hartford Dark Blues players
Baseball players from Hartford, Connecticut
1853 births
1917 deaths